Richard Howard Hunt (born September 12, 1935) is an American sculptor. In the second half of the 20th century, he became "the foremost African-American abstract sculptor and artist of public sculpture." Hunt, the descendant of enslaved people brought through the port of Savannah from West Africa, studied at the School of the Art Institute of Chicago in the 1950s, and while there received multiple prizes for his work.  He was the first African American sculptor to have a retrospective at Museum of Modern Art in 1971. Hunt has created over 160 public sculpture commissions in prominent locations in 24 states across the United States, more than any other sculptor.

With a career that spans seven decades, Hunt has held over 150 solo exhibitions and is represented in more than 100 public museums across the world. Hunt has served on the Smithsonian Institution's National Board of Directors. Hunt's abstract, modern and contemporary sculpture work is notable for its presence in exhibitions and public displays as early as the 1950s, despite social pressures for the obstruction of African-American art at the time. Barack Obama said "Richard Hunt is one of the greatest artists Chicago has ever produced."

Early life
Hunt was born in 1935 in the neighborhood of Woodlawn on Chicago's South Side. Hunt and his younger sister Marian grew up in South Side Chicago, but moved to Galesburg, Illinois at eleven years old where he spent the majority of his time in the city of Chicago. From an early age he was interested in the arts, as his mother, a beautician and librarian, would bring him to performances by local opera companies that sang classical repertoires of Mozart, Rossini, Verdi, and Handel. As a young boy, Hunt began to show enthusiasm and talent in artistic disciplines such as drawing and painting, and also sculpture, an interest that grew more and more as he got older. Hunt was inspired to pursue his career in the arts because his family appreciated art and he clearly said "My mom was supportive and dad was tolerant." In the seventh grade, Hunt attended the Junior School of Art Institute of Chicago where he began his interest in art. Hunt also acquired business sense and awareness of social issues from working for his father in a barbershop.

As a teenager, Hunt began his work in sculpture, working in clay and carvings. While his work started in a makeshift studio in his 1950 bedroom, he eventually built a basement studio in his father's barbershop.

Education 
Hunt graduated from Englewood High School in 1953 and entered the School of the Art Institute of Chicago that year. He was once interested in Surrealism where he experimented with the assemblage of broken machine parts and metals from the junkyard such as car bumpers and reshaping them into organic forms. Hunt worked with materials of copper, iron and then to steel and aluminum which led to him to produce a series of "hybrid figures" which were references to human, animal and plant forms. This is where Hunt attains a combination of organic and industrial subject matter in his artwork. Hunt studied at the Art Institute of Chicago from 1953 to 1957, focusing on welding sculptures, but also studying lithography.  His earliest works were more figural than his later ones, and usually represented classical themes.  Hunt began exhibiting his sculptures nationwide while still a student at the School of the Art Institute of Chicago. As a Junior, his piece "Arachne," was purchased by the Museum of Modern Art in New York. He received a B.A.E. from the Art Institute of Chicago in 1957.

European travel 

Upon graduating, Hunt was awarded the James Nelson Raymond Foreign Travel Fellowship He sails to England on the SS United States and then to Paris, where he leases a car, a Citroën 2CV, for travel to Spain, Italy, and eventually back to Paris. He spent most of his time in Europe in Italy, particularly in Florence, where he learned to cast and create his first sculptures using that technique, in bronze, at the renowned Marinelli foundry. His time abroad solidified his belief that metal was the definitive medium of the twentieth century.

Military service 
Hunt served in the United States Army from 1958 to 1960. He took basic training at Fort Leonard Wood.  Hunt served as an illustrator for Brooke Army Medical Center. While stationed in Texas, Hunt rented a newly constructed house on the base in a neighborhood occupied only by white noncommissioned officers; as the first African American to live there, he desegregated the neighborhood.

Desegregation 
March 7, 1960, Mary Andrews, president of the local youth council of the NAACP, writes letters to store managers in downtown San Antonio who operate white-only lunch counters. Encouraged by the growing sit-in movement, she requests equal services be provided to all, regardless of race. Hunt in uniform goes to lunch at Woolworth's on March 16, 1960, is seated at the counter, has his order taken, and is served without incident. Hunt, the only known African American to eat at San Antonio's Woolworth's lunch counter that day, fulfills Mary Andrews vision of integration. This action, along with a handful of other African Americans at other lunch counters across the city, make San Antonio the first peaceful and voluntary lunch counter integration in the south.

Museum of Modern Art 
Hunt's work has been exhibited 12 times at the Museum of Modern Art in New York, including a major solo retrospective in 1971, when the artist was only 35 years old. Titled The Sculpture of Richard Hunt, March 25 – July 9, 1971, Hunt became the first African American sculptor to be given a retrospective by MoMA, this was only the second exhibition for a black artist of any kind in the history of the museum.

Career 
Hunt began to experiment with materials and sculpting techniques, influenced heavily by progressive twentieth-century artists. Hunt was inspired to focus on sculpture because of the 1950s exhibition called the Sculpture of the Twentieth Century that was held at the Art Institute of Chicago in 1953.  The Sculpture of the Twentieth Century included works of Pablo Picasso, Julio González and David Smith. At the exhibition, this was the first time Hunt saw various artworks of welded metal. Hunt was also inspired and paid respect to French sculptor Raymond Duchamp-Villon whose 1914 bronze "Horse" was instructional. Seeing these artists' works led Hunt to created abstract shapes by welding metal.

In the 1960s and 1970s, Hunt used car junkyards as his quarries and turned bumpers and fenders into abstract, welded sculptures. Hunt also focused on linear-spatial arrangement of his materials where he followed Julio Gonzalez's footsteps into three dimensional structures. This experimentation garnered critically positive response from the art community, such that Hunt was exhibited at the Artists of Chicago and Vicinity Show and the American Show, where the Museum of Modern Art purchased a piece for its collection. He was the youngest artist to exhibit at the 1962 Seattle World's Fair, a major international survey exhibition of modern art.

Hunt received his first sculpture commission in 1967 known as Play, which was commissioned by the State of Illinois Public Art Program. The making of this sculpture led him to many other public commissions and was considered to be his second career as a public sculptor. Hunt has completed more public sculptures than any other artist in the country. His signature pieces include Jacob's Ladder at the Carter G. Woodson Library in Chicago and Flintlock Fantasy in Detroit. His 1972 sculpture, Natural Forms II, can currently be seen at the Delaware Art Museum.

He was appointed by President Lyndon Johnson as one of the first artists to serve on the governing board of the National Endowment for the Arts and he also served on boards of the Smithsonian Institution. From 1980 to 1988, Hunt served as Commissioner of the Smithsonian Institution's National Museum of American Art. From 1994 to 1997, Hunt served on the Smithsonian Institution's National Board of Directors.  Hunt is the recipient of numerous awards and honorary degrees.

In 1971, Hunt acquired a deactivated electrical substation near northern Chicago and repurposed it into a metal welding sculpture studio.  The station came equipped with a bridge crane, which was convenient for moving large sculpture pieces, and a spacious 40-foot ceiling.  While handling the metal, Hunt works with two assistants. Hunt describes metalworks as "free play of forms evolving, developing and contrasting with one another."

Hunt has continued to experiment throughout his successful career, employing a wide range of sculptural techniques. Through his work, Hunt often makes comments on contemporary social and political issues.

National Endowment for the Arts 
Hunt was the first African American visual artist to serve on the National Council on the Arts, the governing body of the National Endowment for the Arts. Hunt was appointed by President Lyndon B. Johnson in 1968. He was the fourth African American on the council, after Marian Anderson, Ralph Ellison, and Duke Ellington.

Monuments 
Hunt has sculpted major monuments for some of America’s greatest heroes, including Martin Luther King, Jr., Mary McLeod Bethune, John Jones, Hobart Taylor, Jr., and Ida B. Wells. His massive 30-foot wide bronze, “Swing Low,” hangs from the ceiling of the National Museum of African American History and Culture, a monument to the African American Spiritual. Another welded Hunt sculpture, “Hero Construction,” now stands as the centerpiece of The Art Institute of Chicago.

Obama Presidential Center Commission 
On February 26, 2022, the Obama Foundation announced the commission of the sculpture "Book Bird" for the Barack Obama Presidential Center. The sculpture is an elaboration from a piece Hunt created as an award to supporters of the United Negro College Fund. "This beautiful piece encapsulates the progress one can make through reading—embodying the inspiration we hope all young people take away when they visit the Obama Presidential Center." – Obama Foundation

“I’ve been a huge admirer of your work for a long time, and Michelle has as well.” – President Barack Obama to sculptor Richard Hunt

Getty Research Institute Acquires Richard Hunt Archive  
The Getty Research Institute acquired the archive of Richard Hunt in October 2022. The Richard Hunt archive contains approximately 800 linear feet of detailed notes and correspondence, notebooks, sketchbooks, photographic documentation, financial records, research, ephemera, blueprints, posters, drawings, and lithographs, as well as a selection of wax models for public sculptures. “Richard Hunt is one of the foremost American artists of the mid- to late-20th century,” says LeRonn Brooks, associate curator for modern and contemporary collections. “I am thrilled that Getty, whom I first became affiliated with through my participation in the Getty Center for Education in the Arts during the 1980s, will be the home of my archive,” says Richard Hunt. “The entirety of my papers, photographs, letters, and sketches trace the arc of my career and my contribution to art history. I hope that my archive will serve not only as a remembrance but an inspiration to others.”

Statements by Richard Hunt 

In some works it is my intention to develop the kind of forms nature might create if only heat and steel were available to her.
A sculptor can be thought of as the sort of person who can reduce impressions of things, responses, and ideas about things into sculptural forms. Sometimes these sculptural forms are simply sculptural forms; sometimes these forms can be formed into sculptures. The creation of a sculpture can be considered the process by which a sculptor demonstrates to himself whether or not he is creating a sculpture.
Everything that exists, natural or man made, contains some sculptural quality or property. I try to appropriate the sculpturalness of any of these forms into my work whenever they seem a reasonable extension of my current vocabulary of forms.
One hopes to see from what has been done, what can be done.One of the central themes in my work is the reconciliation of the organic and the industrial. I see my work as forming a kind of bridge between what we experience in nature and what we experience from the urban, industrial, technology-driven society we live in. I like to think that within the work that I approach most successfully there is a resolution of the tension between the sense of freedom one has in contemplating nature and the sometimes restrictive, closed feeling engendered by the rigors of the city, the rigors of the industrial environment. I must, I can, I will provide the physical evidence of me and my family having lived upon this earth, this planet. In the great scheme of things it is less than a drop in the bucket but it pleases me to be able to leave this evidence here for a time.
Imagining a world without racial hierarchy, I work as if race did not exist.Sculpture is not a self-declaration but a voice of and for my people. Over all a rich fabric; under all about the dynamism of the African American people.I have always been interested in the concept of freedom on the personal and universal levels: political freedom, freedom to think and to feel. As an African American living in the United States, obviously issues like segregation laws, the civil rights movement in the 1960s or South Africa have been on my mind when I have dealt with the concept of freedom. But freedom also relates to my career as an artist: freedom of mind, thought and imagination.
My own use of winged forms in the early ’50s is based on mythological themes, like Icarus and Winged Victory. It’s about, on the one hand, trying to achieve victory or freedom internally. It’s also about investigating ideas of personal and collective freedom. My use of these forms has roots and resonances in the African-American experience and is also a universal symbol.

Selected awards
1956 		Mr and Mrs. Frank G. Logan Medal and Prize, Art Institute of Chicago
1957 		James Nelson Raymond Traveling Fellowship, School of the Art Institute of Chicago 
1957 		Pauline Palmer Prize, Art Institute of Chicago
1961 		Mr and Mrs. Frank G. Logan Medal and Prize, Art Institute of Chicago
1962 		Mr and Mrs. Frank G. Logan Medal and Prize, Art Institute of Chicago
1962 		Walter M. Campana Prize, Art Institute of Chicago
1962-63 		John Simon Guggenheim Memorial Foundation Fellowship
1965 		Tamarind Artist Fellowship, Ford Foundation
1970 		Award, Cassandra Foundation
1980 		James Van Der Zee Lifetime Achievement Award, Brandywine Workshop and Archives
1990 		Sidney R. Yates Art Advocacy Award, Illinois Arts Alliance Foundation
1993 		Laureate, Lincoln Academy of Illinois
1997 		Artists Award, The Studio Museum in Harlem
1998 		Distinguished Artist, The Union League Club of Chicago
1998 		Member, American Academy of Arts and Letters
1999 		Chicago African American History Maker Award, The DuSable Museum of African American History, Chicago 
1999 		Member, National Academy of Design
2003 		Harry W. Watrous Prize and Elizabeth N. Watrous Medal, National Academy of Design
2004 		Archibald Motley Jr. History Maker Award for Distinction in Visual Arts, Chicago History Museum
2005 		Malvina Hoffman Artists Fund Award, National Academy of Design
2009 		Charlotte Dunwiddie Prize, National Academy of Design
 2009 		Lifetime Achievement Award, International Sculpture Center
2010 		Legacy Award, United Negro College Fund
2011 		Ruth Horwich Award to a Famous Chicago Artist, City of Chicago Department of Cultural Affairs
2014 		Fifth Star Award, City of Chicago
2014 		Lifetime Achievement Award, Howard University
2015 		Alain Locke International Art Award, Detroit Institute of Arts
2015 		Lifetime Achievement Award, Partners for Livable Communities
2017 		Legendary Landmark's Honoree, Landmarks Illinois
2022 		Legends and Legacy Award, Art Institute of Chicago

Honorary degrees
1972 		Lake Forest College, Lake Forest, IL
1973 		Dayton Art Institute, Dayton, OH
1976 		University of Michigan, Ann Arbor
1977 		Illinois State University, Normal 
1979 		Colorado State University, Fort Collins 
1982 		School of the Art Institute of Chicago
1984 		Northwestern University, Evanston, IL
1986 		Monmouth College, Monmouth, IL
1987 		Roosevelt University, Chicago
1991 		Tufts University, Medford, MA
1996 		Columbia College, Chicago
1997 		Governors State University, University Park, IL
2004 		North Carolina A&T State University, Greensboro
2007 		University of Notre Dame, Notre Dame, IN
2013 		Valparaiso University, Valparaiso, IN
2022 		Southern Illinois University, Carbondale

Selected works
A Bridge Across and Beyond (1978), Washington, D.C.
Wing Generator (1980) University of Notre Dame, Indiana
Symbiosis (c. 1981), Washington, D.C.
Build-Grow (1986), Jamaica, Queens, New York
Build-Grow (1992), Washington, D.C.

Selected public collections

 Albright-Knox Art Gallery, Buffalo, NY
 Allen Memorial Art Museum, Oberlin College, Oberlin, OH
 Amon Carter Museum of American Art, Fort Worth
 Applewood-Ruth Mott Foundation, Flint, MI
 Art, Design and Architecture Museum, University of California, Santa Barbara
 Art in Embassies, U.S. Department of State, Washington, DC
 Art Institute of Chicago
 Art Museum of the University of Memphis
 Baltimore Museum of Art
 Berkeley Art Museum and Pacific Film Archive, Berkeley, CA
 Birmingham Museum of Art, Birmingham, AL
 Bowdoin College Museum of Art, Brunswick, ME
 Brauer Museum of Art, Valparaiso University, Valparaiso, IN
 Brooklyn Museum, Brooklyn, NY
 The Butler Institute of American Art, Youngstown, OH
 Cantor Arts Center, Stanford University, Stanford, CA
 Chazen Museum of Art, University of Wisconsin–Madison
 Cincinnati Art Museum, Cincinnati, OH
 The Cleveland Museum of Art, Cleveland, OH
 Colby College Museum of Art, Waterville, ME
 The Columbus Museum, Columbus, GA
 David Owsley Museum of Art, Ball State University, Muncie, IN
 The Dayton Art Institute, Dayton, OH
 de Young Museum, Fine Arts Museums of San Francisco
 DePaul Art Museum, DePaul University, Chicago
 Denver Art Museum
 Detroit Institute of Arts
 The DuSable Museum of African American History, Chicago
 Elmhurst University Art Collection, Elmhurst, IL
 Eskenazi Museum of Art, Indiana University, Bloomington
 Franklin D. Murphy Sculpture Garden, Hammer Museum, University of California, Los Angeles
 Fred Jones Jr. Museum of Art, University of Oklahoma, Norman, OK
 Frederik Meijer Gardens and Sculpture Park, Grand Rapids, MI
 Gallery of Art, Howard University, Washington, DC[JB1] [JO2] 
 Georgia Museum of Art, University of Georgia, Athens
 Greenville County Museum of Art, Greenville, SC
 Hammonds House Museum, Atlanta
 Harvard Art Museums, Cambridge, MA
 Herbert F. Johnson Museum of Art, Cornell University, Ithaca, NY
 High Museum of Art, Atlanta
 Hirshhorn Museum and Sculpture Garden, Smithsonian Institution, Washington, DC
 Housatonic Museum of Art, Bridgeport, CT
 Hunter Museum of American Art, Chattanooga, TN
 Illinois State Museum, Springfield
 Indianapolis Museum of Art
 The Israel Museum, Jerusalem
 The Jewish Museum, New York
 Kalamazoo Institute of Arts, Kalamazoo, MI
 Koehnline Museum of Art, Oakton Community College, Des Plaines, IL
 Krannert Art Museum, University of Illinois at Urbana-Champaign
 Krasl Art Center, Saint Joseph, MI
 Laumeier Sculpture Park, Saint Louis, MO
 Los Angeles County Museum of Art
 Lubeznik Center for the Arts, Michigan City, IN
 McCutchan Art Center/Pace Galleries, University of Southern Indiana, Evansville
 McNay Art Museum, San Antonio
 Memphis Brooks Museum of Art
 The Metropolitan Museum of Art, New York
 Miami University Art Museum, Oxford, OH
 Midwest Museum of American Art, Elkhart, IN
 Milwaukee Art Museum
 Minneapolis Institute of Art, Minneapolis, MN
 Mott-Warsh Collection, Flint, MI
 Museum Moderner Kunst (mumok), Stiftung Ludwig, Vienna
 Museum of Contemporary Art Chicago
 Museum of Contemporary Art San Diego
 Museum of Fine Arts, Boston
 Museum of Fine Arts, Houston
 The Museum of Modern Art, New York
 Nasher Museum of Art, Duke University, Durham, NC
 Nassau County Museum of Art, Roslyn Harbor, NY
 Nathan Manilow Sculpture Park, Governors State University, University Park, IL
 National Academy of Design, New York
 National Gallery of Art, Washington, DC
 National Museum of African American History and Culture, Washington, DC
 The Nelson-Atkins Museum of Art, Kansas City, MO
 Neuberger Museum of Art, Purchase College, State University of New York
 New Jersey State Museum, Trenton
 North Carolina Central University, Durham, NC
 Norton Simon Museum, Pasadena, CA
 Paul R. Jones Museum, University of Alabama Museums, Tuscaloosa
 Pennsylvania Academy of the Fine Arts, Philadelphia
 Peoria Riverfront Museum, Peoria, IL[JB3] [JO4]
 Philadelphia Museum of Art
 Portland Art Museum, Portland, OR
 Portland Museum of Art, Portland, ME
 Princeton University Art Museum, Princeton, NJ
 RISD Museum, Rhode Island School of Design, Providence
 Samuel Dorsky Museum of Art, State University of New York at New Paltz
 SCAD Museum of Art, Savannah College of Art and Design, Savannah, GA
 Schomburg Center for Research in Black Culture, New York Public Library
 Sheldon Museum of Art, University of Nebraska–Lincoln
 Smart Museum of Art, University of Chicago
 Smithsonian American Art Museum, Washington, DC
 Snite Museum of Art, University of Notre Dame, Notre Dame, IN
 Speed Art Museum, Louisville, KY
 Springfield Art Museum, Springfield, MO
 Storm King Art Center, Mountainville, NY
 The Studio Museum in Harlem, New York
 Swope Art Museum, Terre Haute, IN
 Telfair Museums, Savannah, GA
 Tougaloo College Art Collections, Tougaloo, MS
 Tufts University Art Galleries, Medford, MA
 UCF Art Gallery, University of Central Florida, Orlando
 University Museum at Southern Illinois University, Carbondale
 The University of Arizona Museum of Art, Tucson
 University of Michigan Museum of Art, Ann Arbor
 Utah Museum of Fine Arts, Salt Lake City
 Virginia Museum of Fine Arts, Richmond
 Weatherspoon Art Museum, University of North Carolina, Greensboro
 Whitney Museum of American Art, New York
 Wichita Art Museum, Wichita, KS
 Williams College Museum of Art, Williamstown, MA 
 Yale University Art Gallery, New Haven, CT

References

Sources
 
 
 
 Baltimore Museum of Art, and Jay McKean Fisher. Prints by a Sculptor: Richard Hunt. Baltimore: Baltimore Museum of Art, 1979.

1935 births
Living people
Artists from Chicago
University of Illinois Chicago alumni
20th-century American sculptors
20th-century American male artists
21st-century American sculptors
21st-century American male artists
American male sculptors
American contemporary artists
 
Sculptors from Illinois
African-American sculptors
20th-century African-American artists
21st-century African-American artists
Members of the American Academy of Arts and Letters